The 1878 Grand National was the 40th renewal of the Grand National horse race that took place at Aintree near Liverpool, England, on 29 March 1878.

Finishing Order

Non-finishers

References

 1878
Grand National
Grand National
19th century in Lancashire